Aibak may refer to:

 Aybak, Samangan, a town in Afghanistan, formerly called Aibak
 Qutb al-Din Aibak (r. 1206–1210), ruler of Delhi Sultanate in present-day India
 Saifuddin Aibak (r. 1233), governor of Bengal in present-day Bangladesh and India
 Awar Khan Aibak (r. 1235–1236), governor of Bengal in present-day Bangladesh and India

See also 
 Aybak (disambiguation)